Drassanes may refer to:

 the Drassanes Reials de Barcelona, a former royal shipyard and current maritime museum in the city of Barcelona, Catalonia, Spain
 the Drassanes metro station, in the city of Barcelona, Catalonia, Spain